Eupithecia pernotata, or Guenée's pug, is a moth of the family Geometridae. The species was first described by Achille Guenée in 1857. It is known from the Alps, through Romania to southern Russia. It is also found in Finland.

The wingspan is 18–19 mm. There is one generation per year with adults on wing from mid-June to mid-July.

The larvae feed on Tanacetum vulgare, Artemisia vulgaris, Artemisia campestris and Pimpinella saxifraga. Larvae can be found from June to mid-September. It overwinters as a pupa in the ground.

Subspecies
Eupithecia pernotata pernotata
Eupithecia pernotata enictata Pellmyr & Mikkola, 1984

Taxonomy
Eupithecia antaggregata was treated as a synonym by Vladimir G. Mironov in 2003.

References

External links
"08525 Eupithecia pernotata Guenée, 1857". Lepiforum e.V. Retrieved May 1, 2019.

Moths described in 1857
pernotata
Moths of Europe
Taxa named by Achille Guenée